Major William Evander Penn (1832–1895) was a Texas Baptist evangelist and well known minister who preached widely in America and Europe.  His visit of castles in Europe inspired him to build a castle of his own in 1888 where he and his wife Corrilla Frances Sayles Penn lived for several years.  "Penn Castle" still stands in Eureka Springs, Arkansas and was featured on the HGTV show If Walls Could Talk. The First Baptist Penn Memorial Church of Eureka Springs was named in his honor.  He authored an enduring hymn, The Sheltering Rock

References

HGTV's If Walls Could Talk; Episode "Castle of Cash" (Episode WCT-1804H)

External links
Bio at Handbook of Texas Online
 
 J. Michael Linder, William Evander Penn: Texas Baptist evangelist, Baptist History and Heritage, 2003
 The Sheltering Rock The Cyber Hymnal

1832 births
1895 deaths
American evangelists
Baptists from Arkansas
People from Carroll County, Arkansas
People from Eureka Springs, Arkansas
19th-century Baptists
19th-century American clergy